Samuel Anthony Fairley (born 19 September 1980) is a New Zealand cricketer who plays for the Wellington Firebirds. He has also played for Wellington City in the Hawke Cup. He was born in Whakatane.

References

1980 births
Living people
New Zealand cricketers
Wellington cricketers
Sportspeople from Whakatāne